Cheng Shao-chieh (born 4 January 1986) is a badminton player from  Taiwan.

Cheng played badminton at the 2004 Summer Olympics for the Republic of China as Chinese Taipei. In women's singles, she defeated Ling Wan Ting of Hong Kong and Jun Jae-youn of South Korea in the first two rounds. In the quarterfinals, Cheng lost to Gong Ruina of China 3–11, 3–11. Later that year, she played in the 2004 World Junior Championships, held in Richmond, Canada, where she won the gold title in girls' singles. She also participated in the 2005 World Championships in Anaheim, California, making it to the semifinals and taking a game from the eventual champion, Xie Xingfang. She achieved a world championship silver medal in 2011 in London. She reached the final, winning all her matches in straight games. In the quarterfinal she beat the then world number 1, Wang Shixian from China, and in the semifinal she outclassed Juliane Schenk from Germany 18 and 6.  At the 2012 Summer Olympics, she again reached the quarter-finals, qualifying through from group C. She then beat Gu Juan in the second round before losing to Wang Yihan.

Achievements

World Championships 
Women's singles

Asian Championships 
Women's singles

Summer Universiade 
Women's singles

Women's doubles

World University Championships 
Women's singles

World Junior Championships 
Girls' singles

Mixed doubles

Asian Junior Championships 
Girls' doubles

BWF Superseries 
The BWF Superseries, which was launched on 14 December 2006 and implemented in 2007, was a series of elite badminton tournaments, sanctioned by the Badminton World Federation (BWF). BWF Superseries levels were Superseries and Superseries Premier. A season of Superseries consisted of twelve tournaments around the world that had been introduced since 2011. Successful players were invited to the Superseries Finals, which were held at the end of each year.

Women's singles

  Superseries tournament
  Superseries Premier tournament
  Superseries Finals tournament

BWF Grand Prix 
The BWF Grand Prix had two levels, the Grand Prix and Grand Prix Gold. It was a series of badminton tournaments sanctioned by the Badminton World Federation (BWF) and played between 2007 and 2017.

Women's singles

  BWF Grand Prix Gold tournament
  BWF Grand Prix tournament

BWF International Challenge/Series 
Women's singles

Record against selected opponents 
Record against year-end Finals finalists, World Championships semi-finalists, and Olympic quarter-finalists.

References

External links 
 
 

1986 births
Living people
Sportspeople from Taipei
Taiwanese female badminton players
Badminton players at the 2004 Summer Olympics
Badminton players at the 2008 Summer Olympics
Badminton players at the 2012 Summer Olympics
Olympic badminton players of Taiwan
Badminton players at the 2006 Asian Games
Badminton players at the 2010 Asian Games
Asian Games competitors for Chinese Taipei
Universiade gold medalists for Chinese Taipei
Universiade silver medalists for Chinese Taipei
Universiade bronze medalists for Chinese Taipei
Universiade medalists in badminton
Medalists at the 2007 Summer Universiade
Medalists at the 2011 Summer Universiade